Stejari is a commune in Gorj County, Oltenia, Romania. It is composed of six villages: Baloșani, Băcești, Dealu Leului, Piscoiu, Popești-Stejari and Stejari.

References

Communes in Gorj County
Localities in Oltenia